William Frederick Kirk (April 29, 1877 – March 25, 1927) was an American baseball writer, columnist, humorist, poet and songwriter.

Biography
Born in Mankato, Minnesota, Kirk spent most of his childhood in Chippewa Falls, Wisconsin. He graduated from high school there and began his career in journalism on a local paper. His humor column, "Fleeting Fancies", was a popular feature in the Chippewa Falls Herald and later in the Milwaukee Sentinel. It brought him to the attention of metropolitan dailies and was the name of his first book, published in 1904.  Kirk's lyrics drew comparisons with those of other poets, whose work he sometimes parodied: Henry Wadsworth Longfellow, Eugene Field, and James Whitcomb Riley.

A longtime newspaperman, Kirk got his start at press outlets in Chippewa Falls and Milwaukee. In 1905 he signed a contract with the Hearst organization and moved to New York, where he was employed at two of William Randolph Hearst's papers: the New York American and the New York Evening Journal.  After returning to Chippewa Falls in 1918, he continued working as a nationally syndicated columnist.

For eighteen years Kirk was distributed by the International Features Syndicate and reached a national audience as he wrote on subjects as diverse as baseball, temperance, women's suffrage and divorce. His pieces were seen in everything from "The Smart Set" to trade union publications. He was widely known for the features "Little Bobbie's Pa" and "The Manicure Lady".

Recent works on baseball's deadball era have had numerous examples of Kirk's sports writing. One can, for instance, read his account of Fred Merkle's infamous blunder  or his rhyming tribute to the Flying Dutchman, Honus Wagner. The Unforgettable Season by Gordon H. Fleming recounts the 1908 National League pennant race through contemporary press coverage by Kirk and others. In 1911 Kirk published a collection of baseball ballads called Right Off The Bat.

In 1918 Kirk moved back to Chippewa Falls, desiring to live among old friends and familiar surroundings. He belonged to several fraternal organizations and was a prominent figure in the town.

Failing health caused his early retirement, and after an illness of many months he died of cancer in 1927.

The Norsk Nightingale

William F. Kirk is especially remembered for his Scandinavian dialect poetry, written for a daily column and later published in book form. His byline, "The Norsk Nightingale", was a familiar sight in newspapers across the country.  His first collection of dialect verse,  The Norsk Nightingale, presented a Norwegian lumberjack from the Upper Midwest. It was his most popular book with sixteen editions printed over a period of thirty-five years. At the time of its publication one reviewer wrote: "Novelty and freshness, and no little ingenuity as a parodist, salute us in this volume of dialect verse hailing from the haunts of the lumberjack or, more locally, northern Wisconsin and Minnesota, where dwell so many neo-Americans of Scandinavian birth."

His second volume of dialect verse, Songs of Sergeant Swanson, reflected the experiences of a Swedish doughboy in World War I. A book of more limited appeal, it only had one edition.

Scandinavian dialect humor
Kirk's ethnic poetry put forth the notion that Scandinavian-Americans were good-natured but a little slow.  This humorous stereotype had been employed in the 1890s by the playwright Gus Heege in such theatrical works as "Ole Olson" and "Yon Yonson".<ref>[https://books.google.com/books?id=ybLY1kyWxUcC&dq=%22Gus+J.+Heege:+Actor,+Playwright,+Originator%22&pg=PA71 History Studies edited by Rhona Justice-Malloy, (Tuscaloosa, Alabama: University of Alabama Press, 2008). Volume 28, pp. 71 - 82.]</ref>

Scandinavian dialect humor took other forms: vaudeville sketches, joke books, movies, records and sheet music. In quick succession Tin Pan Alley published "Hello Wisconsin", "Holy Yumpin Yiminy" and "Scandinavia" (Sing Dose Song And Make Dose Music). The popular recording artists Eleonora and Ethel Olson were known for their warm depictions of immigrant life in such stories as "The Old Sogning Woman" and "A Norwegian Woman Using the Telephone".

El Brendel, Yogi Yorgesson, Stan Boreson and countless others have followed in Kirk's footsteps, and there is still a receptive audience — especially among  Scandinavian-Americans — for tales of lumberjacks and sergeants with more heart than brain.Vintage Scandinavian humor archive.org. Retrieved: October 07, 2019.

Works
BooksFleeting Fancies 1904The Norsk Nightingale 1905Right Off The Bat 1911Songs Of Sergeant Swanson 1918Out Of The Current 1923The Harp Of Fate'' 1925

Songs
 "Steve" - William F. Kirk and Harry von Tilzer (1910)
 "I'm Going Down to Beat My Wife" - William F. Kirk and Harry von Tilzer (c. 1910)
 "Flirt" - lyrics by Edward Madden and William F. Kirk, music by Henri Bereny (1911) 
 "Little White Rose of Mine" - William F. Kirk and Robert Matthews (1911) 
 "Consolation" - William F. Kirk and Gustave Ferrari (1917)
 "Flag of My Heart" - William F. Kirk and Gustave Ferrari (1917)
 "The Other Love" - William F. Kirk and Gustave Ferrari (1917)
 "The Rainbow of Love" - William F. Kirk and Gustave Ferrari (1917)
 "The Harbor of Dreams" - William F. Kirk and Gustave Ferrari (1918)
 "A Sunset Song" - William F. Kirk and Gustave Ferrari (1918)
 "Glory Land" - William F. Kirk and Gustave Ferrari (1919)
 "Red Rose of Love, Bloom Again" - William F. Kirk and J. Stanton Gladwin (1920)
 "Speak For Yureself, Yohn" - William F. Kirk and Henry S. Sawyer (1922)

"Flirt" was in the Broadway musical Little Boy Blue.
"Flag Of My Heart" was recorded by Reinald Werrenrath for Victor Records.
"The Rainbow Of Love" was recorded by John McCormack for Victor Records.

Gallery

References

External links
 
 
  
 
 The Harp Of Fate at Google Books

Historic American newspapers
William F. Kirk
The Norsk Nightingale: dialect verse
Little Bobbie's Pa: humorous prose series
The Manicure Lady: humorous prose series

Articles and advertisements
"America's Newest Humorist" in The National Magazine 1904
"The Norsk Nightingale" in The Publishers Weekly 1905
William F. Kirk in Volume One Magazine 2010
Poet laureate of Chippewa Falls remembered in song" 2014 
 William F. Kirk at the Society for American Baseball Research.

The Norsk Nightingale
Poems by William F. Kirk

Sheet music
"Scandinavia" at Indiana University.
"Holy Yumpin Yiminy" at Duke University.
"Hello Wisconsin" at Johns Hopkins University.
"Flag of My Heart" at the Library of Congress
"Glory Land" at the Library of Congress

Streaming audio
"Flag Of My Heart" at the Library of Congress
"The Rainbow Of Love" at the Library of Congress
"Little Boy Blue Medley" at the Library of Congress
William F. Kirk at the Internet Archive

1877 births
1927 deaths
American columnists
American humorists
Baseball writers
Ethnic humour
Stereotypes of white people
American humorous poets
Norwegian migration to North America
People from Mankato, Minnesota
People from Chippewa Falls, Wisconsin
Swedish migration to North America
Writers from Minnesota
Writers from Wisconsin